Darrell Montague (born November 3, 1987) is an American mixed martial artist who formerly competed in the flyweight division of the Ultimate Fighting Championship.

Background
Montague, originally from Chino, California, grew up around the sport of boxing and began competing in high school wrestling at the age of 15. The assistant coach, mixed martial arts fighter Manny Tapia, drew Montague's interest into MMA, and Montague soon also began training in Muay Thai and Brazilian jiu-jitsu.

Mixed martial arts career

Early career
Montague started his MMA career in 2008 and fought mainly for local organizations. He compiled a professional record of 6–1, losing only once against UFC veteran Robbie Peralta.

Tachi Palace Fights
After winning two bouts, Montague faced Ulysses Gomez on February 18, 2011 at Tachi Palace Fights 8 for the flyweight title. He won via unanimous decision and became the TPF flyweight title holder.

He lost his title on August 5, 2011 at Tachi Palace Fights 10 against Ian McCall via third round submission.

Montague faced Taylor McCorriston on May 10, 2012 at Tachi Palace Fights 13. He won via TKO in the first round.

Vale Tudo Japan
Montague faced the former Shooto featherweight and bantamweight champion Mamoru Yamaguchi on December 24, 2012 at Vale Tudo Japan 2012. Montague won via split decision (28-29, 29-28, 30-27).

Ultimate Fighting Championship
In August 2013, it was announced that Montague had finally signed with the UFC. He made his promotional debut against John Dodson on October 19, 2013 at UFC 166. He lost his debut fight via knockout in 4:13 of the first round.

Montague was expected to face Will Campuzano on March 15, 2014 at UFC 171. However, Montague pulled out of the bout citing an injury and was replaced by Justin Scoggins.

Montague faced Kyoji Horiguchi on May 10, 2014 at UFC Fight Night 40. He lost the fight via unanimous decision.

Montague faced Willie Gates on July 21, 2015 at The Ultimate Fighter 21 Finale. He lost the fight via TKO in the first round. Following three consecutive losses, Montague was released from the promotion.

Championships and accomplishments

Mixed martial arts
Tachi Palace Fights
Tachi Palace Fights Flyweight Championship (One time)
Gladiator Challenge
Gladiator Challenge Flyweight Title (One time)
Sherdog
2010 All-Violence 2nd Team
Bas Rutten Awards
2009 Bloodbath of the Year Runner-up

Mixed martial arts record

|-
| Loss
| align=center| 13–5
| Willie Gates
| TKO (knees to the body and elbows)
| The Ultimate Fighter: American Top Team vs. Blackzilians Finale 
| 
| align=center| 1
| align=center| 1:36
| Las Vegas, Nevada, United States
| 
|-
| Loss
| align=center| 13–4
| Kyoji Horiguchi
| Decision (unanimous)
| UFC Fight Night: Brown vs. Silva
| 
| align=center| 3
| align=center| 5:00
| Cincinnati, Ohio, United States
| 
|-
| Loss
| align=center| 13–3
| John Dodson
| KO (punch)
| UFC 166
| 
| align=center| 1
| align=center| 4:13
| Houston, Texas, United States
| 
|-
| Win
| align=center| 13–2
| Jesse Miramontes
| Submission (triangle choke)
| Submission Championship MMA 2
| 
| align=center| 1
| align=center| 2:22
| Ontario, California, United States
| 
|-
| Win
| align=center| 12–2
| Mamoru Yamaguchi
| Decision (split)
| Vale Tudo Japan 1st
| 
| align=center| 3
| align=center| 5:00
| Tokyo, Japan
| 
|-
| Win
| align=center| 11–2
| Taylor McCorriston
| TKO (punches)
| Tachi Palace Fights 13
| 
| align=center| 1
| align=center| 2:46
| Lemoore, California, United States
| 
|-
| Win
| align=center| 10–2
| Kenny McClairn
| Submission (armbar)
| Gladiator Challenge: Star Wars
| 
| align=center| 2
| align=center| 2:41
| San Jacinto, California, United States
| 
|-
| Loss
| align=center| 9–2
| Ian McCall
| Submission (rear-naked choke)
| TPF 10: Let The Chips Fall
| 
| align=center| 3
| align=center| 2:15
| Lemoore, California, United States
| 
|-
| Win
| align=center| 9–1
| Ulysses Gomez
| Decision (unanimous)
| TPF 8: All or Nothing
| 
| align=center| 5
| align=center| 5:00
| Lemoore, California, United States
| 
|-
| Win
| align=center| 8–1
| Luis Gonzalez
| KO (punches)
| TPF 6: High Stakes
| 
| align=center| 1
| align=center| 4:42
| Lemoore, California, United States
| 
|-
| Win
| align=center| 7–1
| Jeremy Bolt
| TKO (body kick)
| TPF 4: Cinco de Mayhem
| 
| align=center| 3
| align=center| 2:21
| Lemoore, California, United States
| 
|-
| Win
| align=center| 6–1
| Chino Nicolas
| Decision (unanimous)
| Gladiator Challenge: Vision Quest
| 
| align=center| 3
| align=center| 3:00
| San Jacinto, California, United States
| 
|-
| Win
| align=center| 5–1
| Joey Bedolla
| Submission (rear-naked choke)
| LBFN 6: Long Beach Fight Night 6
| 
| align=center| 1
| align=center| 2:41
| Long Beach, California, United States
| 
|-
| Win
| align=center| 4–1
| Maurice Eazel
| KO (punches)
| LBFN 4: Long Beach Fight Night 4
| 
| align=center| 3
| align=center| 0:36
| Long Beach, California, United States
| 
|-
| Loss
| align=center| 3–1
| Robbie Peralta
| TKO (punches)
| Gladiator Challenge: Warriors
| 
| align=center| 3
| align=center| 2:55
| Pauma Valley, California, United States
| 
|-
| Win
| align=center| 3–0
| Scott Brommage
| Submission (rear-naked choke)
| LBFN 3: Long Beach Fight Night 3
| 
| align=center| 3
| align=center| 2:36
| Long Beach, California, United States
| 
|-
| Win
| align=center| 2–0
| Ernie Davila
| Submission (rear-naked choke)
| KOW: Knights of War
| 
| align=center| 2
| align=center| N/A
| Ensenada, Mexico
| 
|-
| Win
| align=center| 1–0
| Dillion Croushorn
| KO (spinning back fist)
| GC 79: Genuine Beatdown
| 
| align=center| 2
| align=center| 3:40
| San Bernardino, California, United States
|

See also
 List of current UFC fighters
 List of male mixed martial artists

References

External links
 
 

1987 births
Living people
People from Chino, California
American male mixed martial artists
Flyweight mixed martial artists
Mixed martial artists utilizing boxing
Mixed martial artists utilizing Muay Thai
Mixed martial artists utilizing wrestling
Mixed martial artists utilizing Brazilian jiu-jitsu
Ultimate Fighting Championship male fighters
American practitioners of Brazilian jiu-jitsu
American Muay Thai practitioners